Two Men and a Maid is a 1929 American romantic drama film directed by George Archainbaud and starring William Collier Jr., Alma Bennett and Eddie Gribbon.

Premise
Wrongly believing that his wife has another lover, a man enlists in the French Foreign Legion and goes out to serve in Algeria.

Cast
 William Collier Jr. as Jim Oxford 
 Alma Bennett as Rose 
 Eddie Gribbon as Adjutant 
 George E. Stone as Shorty 
 Margaret Quimby as Margaret

References

Bibliography
 Pitts, Michael R. Poverty Row Studios, 1929–1940: An Illustrated History of 55 Independent Film Companies, with a Filmography for Each. McFarland & Company, 2005.

External links
 

1929 films
1929 romantic drama films
American romantic drama films
Films directed by George Archainbaud
Tiffany Pictures films
Films set in Algeria
Films about the French Foreign Legion
American black-and-white films
1920s English-language films
1920s American films